Dawit I was Emperor of Ethiopia from 1382 to 6 October 1413, and a member of the Solomonic dynasty. He was the younger son of Newaya Krestos.

Reign
Taddesse Tamrat discusses a tradition that early in his reign, Dawit campaigned against Egypt, reaching as far north as Aswan. In response, the Emir forced the Patriarch of Alexandria, Matthew I, to send a deputation to Dawit to persuade him to retire back to his kingdom. Taddesse concludes, "There seems to be little or no doubt that, on the eve of the advent of the Burji dynasty of Mamluk Egypt, King Dawit had in fact led his troops beyond the northern frontiers of his kingdom, and created much havoc among the Muslim inhabitants of the area who had been within the sphere of influence of Egypt since the thirteenth century." The Emperor apparently had a much friendlier relationship with the Sultan's successor, for according to the medieval historian al-Maqrizi, Dawit sent 22 camels laden with gifts to Berkuk, the first Sultan of the Burji dynasty.

He confronted the problem of raids from the Muslim kingdoms on his eastern border with numerous counterattacks on those kingdoms. According to al-Maqrizi, in 1403 Emperor Dawit pursued the Sultan of Ifat, Sa'ad ad-Din II, to Zeila, where he killed Sa'ad ad-Din and sacked the city. However, another contemporary source dates the death of Sa'ad ad-Din to 1415, and gives the credit to Emperor Yeshaq.

Dawit sent an embassy to Europe, which had reached Venice by 23 June 1402, requesting that a number of artisans are sent to his domain. Carlo Conti Rossini assembled the surviving documents concerning this visit in 1927, which record that five artisans departed with the Ethiopian envoy that August, but not if they arrived in Ethiopia. However, Marilyn E. Heldman found evidence of a "silver-gilt chalice" made in Venice, which, if it was the one Francisco Álvares described as seeing in Ethiopia, did reach Dawit. Another possible sign of their arrival is an itinerary of a journey from Venice by Rhodes, Cyprus, Jerusalem, Cairo and Axum to the court of Preste John in Shewa. which O. G. S. Crawford dates to Dawit's reign. Crawford considers this document the "first unambiguous account of Abyssinian geography which has survived; it certainly refers to the journey of a European, and the route followed can be identified pretty accurately."

A noted horseman, Dawit was killed when he was kicked in the head by one of his horses. His body was interred in the monastery of St. Stephen on Daga Island in Lake Tana.

Other events
The Emperor Dawit was an enthusiastic Christian. He dealt with a revolt of the Beta Israel in Gonder, and encouraged missionary work in Gojjam. According to E. A. Wallis Budge, during Dawit's reign, a piece of the True Cross arrived in Ethiopia. He also made endowments to the Ethiopian Church: three charters survive of grants he made of lands in Wolqayt, Serae, Adiyabo, Shire, Addi Arkay, northern Semien, the Gar'alta, Manbarta, and Karnesem which lies north of present-day Asmara.

During Dawit's time atop the throne, two surviving examples of illustrated manuscripts were produced. One is a translation of the Miracles of Mary, which had been written in Arabic, done at the command of Emperor Dawit. This is the oldest surviving illustrated book commissioned by an Ethiopian Emperor. The other, described as "one of the most beautiful illustrated books of the period", is a copy of the gospels, which is now preserved at the monastery of Saint Gabriel on Kebran Island in southern Lake Tana.

Notes

Further reading 
 Getachew Haile, "Documents on the History of Așé Dawit (1382-1413)", Journal of Ethiopian Studies, 16 (July 1983), pp. 25-35
 Meley Mulugetta, "A Mechanical Clock from Venice for Emperor Dawit of Ethiopia" Aethiopica 13 (2010), pp. 189-192

14th-century births
1413 deaths
14th-century emperors of Ethiopia
15th-century emperors of Ethiopia
14th-century monarchs in Africa
15th-century monarchs in Africa
Solomonic dynasty
Year of birth missing
Deaths by horse-riding accident